The 1958–59 international cricket season was from September 1958 to April 1959.

Season overview

November

West Indies in India

December

England in Australia

February

West Indies in Pakistan

England in New Zealand

March

India in Ceylon

References

International cricket competitions by season
1958 in cricket
1959 in cricket